The Tabusintac Lagoon and River Estuary is a wetland in Alnwick Parish, Northumberland County, in north-eastern New Brunswick, Canada. It was classified as a wetland of international importance on June 10, 1993. It is also a globally significant Important Bird Area for the population of common terns, and shorebirds in general, that it supports. Primarily a shallow coastal estuary with gentle slopes, the 50 km2 site is underlain by various sedimentary rocks, including red sandstone and shale. The lagoon system is protected from the Gulf of Saint Lawrence by a constantly shifting barrier beach and dune system
 that frequently blocks commonly used navigation channels. It attains an elevation of no more than 8 m above sea level.

It is located on the Acadian Peninsula, and includes Tabusintac Bay and the mouth of the Tabusintac River. It also contains roughly 6 km2 of peatlands, within which are numerous freshwater ponds.

References

Landforms of Northumberland County, New Brunswick
Ramsar sites in Canada 
Important Bird Areas of New Brunswick
Wetlands of New Brunswick